Alistair G. Sutcliffe (born 1951) is a British scientist and Emeritus Professor of Systems Engineering at the School of Informatics of the University of Manchester, specialized in requirements engineering, user interface design and safety-critical systems.

Life and work 
Sutcliffe received his MA in Natural Sciences from the University of Cambridge, and his PhD in Ethology from the University of Wales.

Before he started his academic career in the City and Manchester Universities, he had worked in the civil service, the finance industry and the IT industry. He retired from the University of Manchester in October 2011.

His research spans "software engineering, human computer interaction, cognitive and social science, with recent interests in scenario based design, methods for requirements engineering, analysis and modelling complex socio technical systems, visualisation and creative design."

Publications 
 
 
 
 
 
 

Articles, a selection:

References 

1951 births
Living people
Systems engineers
Alumni of the University of Cambridge
Academics of the University of Manchester